Nickelsen is a surname. Notable people with this surname include:
 (born 1956), prize-winning poet in the Föhr North Frisian language
Garrett Nickelsen, American rock musician, bassist for The Maine (band)
Kärin Nickelsen (born 1972), German historian of science
John R. Nickelsen, American politician, member of 32nd Oregon Legislative Assembly
Josef Nickelsen, Norwegian architect of 1914 Jubilee Exhibition
Rasmus Nickelsen, Danish swimmer, competed in Swimming at the 2019 European Youth Summer Olympic Festival
Steinar Nickelsen (born 1978), Norwegian jazz musician
Wilhelm Nickelsen, Norwegian bridge player, founder of a predecessor organization to the Norwegian Bridge Federation

See also
Nicolson
Nicholson (name)